Arthur Donald Spatt (December 13, 1925 – June 12, 2020) was a United States district judge of the United States District Court for the Eastern District of New York.

Education and career

Born in Brooklyn, New York, Spatt was a Navigation Petty Officer in the United States Navy from 1944 to 1946, and received a Bachelor of Laws from Brooklyn Law School in 1949. He was in private practice in New York City from 1949 to 1978. He was a state court judge in the Supreme Court of the State of New York, Tenth Judicial District from 1978 to 1982, then an Administrative judge of Nassau County from 1982 to 1986, and an associate justice of the New York Appellate Division, Second Judicial Department, from 1986 to 1989.

Federal judicial service

On October 25, 1989, Spatt was nominated by President George H. W. Bush to a seat on the United States District Court for the Eastern District of New York vacated by Henry Bramwell. Spatt was confirmed by the United States Senate on November 21, 1989, and received commission on November 27, 1989. He assumed senior status on December 1, 2004. His service terminated on June 12, 2020, due to his death at his home in Commack, New York, of the effects of blood cancer.

Notable rulings

Spatt penned the ruling in the Mahender and Varsha Sabhnani slavery federal criminal trial. He awarded rare double damages to Indonesian maids - Samirah, $620,744, and Enung, $315,802. The judgment's award of double damages in federal criminal trials is notable, since the  punitive sums are only, ordinarily granted in civil cases. On August 20, 2012 Spatt suspended a Nassau County law that would have allowed County Executive Edward Mangano to reduce negotiated employee benefits.

See also
List of Jewish American jurists

References

External links

1925 births
2020 deaths
Brooklyn Law School alumni
Judges of the United States District Court for the Eastern District of New York
Lawyers from Brooklyn
Military personnel from New York City
New York Supreme Court Justices
United States district court judges appointed by George H. W. Bush
20th-century American judges
21st-century American judges
Deaths from cancer in New York (state)
Deaths from blood cancer